San Juan de Sabinas is one of the 38 municipalities of Coahuila, in north-eastern Mexico. The municipal seat lies at Nueva Rosita. The municipality covers an area of 735.4 km².

As of 2005, the municipality had a total population of 40,115. 

In 1908, it was the scene of the Mina Rosita Vieja disaster, the worst disaster in Mexico's coal mining history.

References

Municipalities of Coahuila